The Mathis Vega 42 was a 42-cylinder 6-bank in-line radial piston engine, designed and built in France, by Société Mathis Aviation in the late 1930s, with development continuing during and after WWII.

Design and development
Émile E. C. Mathis had begun designing and producing motor-cars from 1910. Société Mathis Aviation, formed in 1937, began designing aircraft engines, initially with the large and complex Vega.

The Vega (and the similar Vesta) had a 2-piece Aluminium-alloy crankcase, 7 Aluminium-alloy cylinder blocks, with one-piece Aluminium-alloy heads and steel cylinder liners. A 6-throw crankshaft ran in 7 plain bearings.

Development continued after the war, culminating in the   Vesta 42, which did not reach the hardware stage before Mathis closed its doors.

Operational history
The Vega engines were run on test-beds, and  some sources indicate the engine was flown 100 hours in a test bed aircraft during 1939, but no details of flight testing survive.

Variants
Vega 42AInitial version of the engine first run in 1938, rated  at 3,000 rpm. Two examples and a full-scale mock-up are reported to have been built.
Vega 42BAn improved variant, under development in 1940. Completed and unfinished engines were hidden from invading German forces, in the Pyrenees.
Vega 42D An enlarged capacity version which became the Vesta 42.

Specifications (42E-00)

See also
 Armstrong Siddeley Deerhound

References

Further reading

External links
LES MOTEURS MATHIS
WW2 AIRCRAFT.NET :MATHIS 'Vega' 42-Cylinder French Aero-Engine

Inline radial engines
1930s aircraft piston engines
Water-cooled radial engines